Hemiphruda mecasa is a moth in the family Drepanidae and the only species in the genus Hemiphruda. It was described by Swinhoe in 1894. It is found in India.

Adults are brown, the forewings with two black spots at the end of the cell, one at the upper end and the other below. There is a diffuse band from the apex of the fore wings to the abdomen. The hindwings have a straight band of three thick brown lines, but not very distinct.

References

Drepaninae
Monotypic moth genera
Moths of Asia
Drepanidae genera